Fyodorovka is a rural locality (a selo) in Klenovskoye Rural Settlement, Zhirnovsky District, Volgograd Oblast, Russia. The population was 216 as of 2010. There are 2 streets.

Geography 
Fyodorovka is located in steppe of Khopyorsko-Buzulukskaya Plain, on the left bank of the Shchelkan River, 38 km northwest of Zhirnovsk (the district's administrative centre) by road. Klyonovka is the nearest rural locality.

References 

Rural localities in Zhirnovsky District